The 1970 Giro d'Italia was the 53rd edition of the Giro d'Italia, one of cycling's Grand Tours. The Giro began in San Pellegrino Terme on 18 May, and Stage 11 occurred on 29 May with a stage from Rivisondoli. The race finished in Bolzano on 7 June.

Stage 11
29 May 1970 — Rivisondoli to Francavilla al Mare,

Stage 12
30 May 1970 — Francavilla al Mare to Loreto,

Stage 13
31 May 1970 — Loreto to Faenza,

Stage 14
1 June 1970 — Faenza to Casciana Terme,

Stage 15
2 June 1970 — Casciana Terme to Mirandola,

Stage 16
3 June 1970 — Mirandola to Lido di Jesolo,

Stage 17
4 June 1970 — Lido di Jesolo to Arta Terme,

Stage 18
5 June 1970 — Arta Terme to Marmolada,

Stage 19
6 June 1970 — Rocca Pietore to Dobbiaco,

Stage 20
7 June 1970 — Dobbiaco to Bolzano,

References

1970 Giro d'Italia
Giro d'Italia stages